Samuel Chandler Paine (February 21, 1807 – April 1, 1888) was an American physician.

Paine, son of John Paine (1776 - 1846), a leading citizen of Woodstock, Connecticut and member of the Connecticut House of Representatives, was born in that town on February 21, 1807.

He graduated from Yale College in 1828.  In 1829 he entered the Yale Medical School, where he was graduated two years later. He began practice immediately in the town of Oxford, in Worcester County, Mass, where he followed his profession successfully until his death. He retained his vigor to advanced age in a remarkable degree, and was widely influential in the community. He was a deacon in the Congregational church; from 1873 to 1881 president of the Oxford National Bank, and in 1879 a Representative in the Massachusetts State Legislature.  On December 1, 1887, he had a very slight shock of paralysis, from which he was supposed, however, to have entirely recovered, when he was again seized in March with a similar attack, from which he died, after two weeks' prostration, on April 1, 1888, in his 82nd year.

He married, June 18, 1834, Abigail, daughter of Abigail Davis, Esq., of Oxford. She died December 28, 1886. Two of their three daughters survived their parents.

References

External links 
 

1807 births
1888 deaths
People from Woodstock, Connecticut
Yale College alumni
Yale School of Medicine
American bankers
Members of the Massachusetts House of Representatives
19th-century American physicians
19th-century American politicians
19th-century American businesspeople